Georgios Diamantis (born 30 January 1979) is a retired Greek football defender.

References

1979 births
Living people
Greek footballers
Panargiakos F.C. players
Apollon Smyrnis F.C. players
Ionikos F.C. players
A.O. Kerkyra players
Panetolikos F.C. players
Agios Dimitrios F.C. players
Panachaiki F.C. players
Ethnikos Piraeus F.C. players
Aittitos Spata F.C. players
Panegialios F.C. players
Association football defenders
Super League Greece players
Footballers from Argos, Peloponnese